Mehmed Dresevic (born 6 June 1992) is a Swedish footballer who plays for Ljungskile.

References

1992 births
Living people
Swedish footballers
Association football defenders
Norrby IF players
AFC Eskilstuna players
Ljungskile SK players
Utsiktens BK players
Ettan Fotboll players
Superettan players
Allsvenskan players